43 Camelopardalis is a single star in the northern circumpolar constellation of Camelopardalis, located roughly 1,060 light years away from the Sun based on parallax. It is visible to the naked eye as a faint, blue-white hued star with an apparent visual magnitude of 5.11. This object is moving closer to the Earth with a heliocentric radial velocity of −21 km/s.

The stellar classification of 43 Camelopardalis is B7 III, matching that of a blue giant. It is spinning rapidly with a projected rotational velocity of 190 km/s. The star has five times the mass of the Sun and about 4.4 times the Sun's radius. It is radiating 724 times the luminosity of the Sun from its photosphere at an effective temperature of 13,183 K.

Chinese name

References

B-type giants
Camelopardalis (constellation)
Durchmusterung objects
Camelopardalis, 43
049340
033104
2511